The Land grant to Marduk-zākir-šumi kudurru is an ancient Mesopotamian narû, or entitlement stele, recording the gift (irīmšu) of 18 bur 2 eše (about 120 hectares or 300 acres) of corn-land by Kassite king of Babylon Marduk-apla-iddina I (ca. 1171–1159 BC) to his bēl pīḫati (inscribed lúEN NAM and meaning "person responsible"), or a provincial official. The monument is significant in part because it shows the continuation of royal patronage in Babylonia during a period when most of the near East was beset by collapse and confusion, and in part due to the lengthy genealogy of the beneficiary, which links him to his illustrious ancestors.

The stele

The monument is a large rectangular block of limestone with a base of 51 by 30.5 cm and a height of 91 cm, or around 3 foot, with a broken top making it the tallest of the extant kudurrus and has intentionally flattened sides. It was recovered from the western bank of the Tigris opposite Baghdad and acquired by George Smith for the British Museum while on his 1873–74 expedition to Nineveh sponsored by the Daily Telegraph. It was originally given the collection reference D.T. 273 and later that of BM 90850. The face has three registers featuring eighteen symbolic representations of gods (listed below identifying the corresponding deity) and the back has three columns of text (line-art pictured right).

First register:
 Crescent moon, Sîn
 Solar disc, Šamaš
 Eight-pointed star, Ištar
 Lamp, Nusku
 Walking bird, Bau
 Eagle/vulture-headed mace, Zababa
 Lion-headed mace, Nergal
 Squatting dog, Gula
 Scorpion, Išḫara
 Reversed yoke on a shrine, Ninḫursag

Second register:
 Bird on a perch, the Kassite deities Šuqamuna & Šumalia
 Reclining ox beneath lightning fork, Adad
 Spear-head behind horned dragon, Marduk
 Wedge supported by horned dragon before shrine, Nabû

Third register:
 Horned serpent spanning register, uncertain
 Turtle, uncertain
 Ram-headed crook above goat-fish, Ea
 Winged dragon stepping on hind part of serpent, uncertain

The land grant was situated west of the river Tigris in the province of Ingur-Ištar, one of perhaps twenty-two pīḫatus or provinces known from the Kassite period, and was bordered by estates belonging to the (house of) Bīt-Nazi-Marduk and Bīt-Tunamissaḫ, perhaps Kassite nobility.

Cast of characters

 Marduk-apla-iddina, the king, donor
 Marduk-zākir-šumi, bēl-pīḫati, beneficiary. His secondary titles included ˹pa˺-˹qí]-id ÉRIN giDUSU: officer of the troops of the charioteers

His ancestors:

 Nabû-nadin-aḫḫē, his father
 Rimeni-Marduk, grandfather
 Uballissu-Marduk, great-grandfather, an accountant during the reign of Kurigalzu II, whose cylinder seals shed further light on his ancestors, naming his forebears Uššur-ana-Marduk as šandabakku or governor of Nippur and Usi-ana-nuri-? as viceroy of Dilmun (ancient Bahrain)
 Arad-Ea, patriarchal figure of the clan and his great-great-grandfather

Witnesses:

 Ninurta-apla-iddina, son of Adad-naṣir šakin or governor of the province of Engur-Ištar
 Nabû-naṣir, son of Nazi-Marduk, sukallu a court official, messenger or vizier
 Nabû-šakin-šumi, son of Arad-Ea, lúDU.GAB, “charioteer”

Principal publications

  line-art and transcription into Assyrian characters
  translation
  revised line-art
  transliteration and translation
  no. 4, line-art
 , pls. 31-42 transliteration, translation and photographs
  no. 62

References

Kassites
Kudurru boundary stones
Sculpture of the Ancient Near East
Middle Eastern objects in the British Museum